Zagorye is a rural locality (a village) in Verkhneshardengskoye Rural Settlement, Velikoustyugsky District, Vologda Oblast, Russia. The population was 1 as of 2002.

Geography 
The distance to Veliky Ustyug is 55 km, to Verkhnyaya Shardenga is 8.7 km. Istopnaya is the nearest rural locality.

References 

Rural localities in Velikoustyugsky District